George Blake (1922–2020) was a former British spy and double agent for the Soviet Union.

George Blake may also refer to:

 George Blagge (sometimes rendered 'Blake') (1512–1551), English courtier, politician, soldier, minor poet
 George Blake (athlete) (1878–1946), Australian Olympic athlete and sportsman
 George Blake (novelist) (1893–1961), Scottish journalist and writer
 George A.H. Blake (1810–1884), US Army cavalry officer 
 George E. Blake (1774–1871), American music publisher
 George S. Blake (1802–1871), US Navy commodore
 George Stanfield Blake (1876–1940), British mineral and mining geologist

Other uses
 USC&GS George S. Blake, US oceanographic vessel

See also
 Blake (disambiguation)
 Blake (surname)